Rabbit Run is a neighborhood in southwestern Lexington, Kentucky, United States. Its boundaries are Harrodsburg Road to the west, Man O War Boulevard to the south, and a combination that includes both Bleinheim Way and Gladman Way to the east. 

Neighborhood Statistics
 Population in 2000: 1,330
 Land area: 
 Population density: 
 Median income in 2000: $95,599

External links
 http://www.city-data.com/neighborhood/Rabbit-Run-Lexington-KY.html

Neighborhoods in Lexington, Kentucky